Damas may refer to:


Geography
 Damas-aux-Bois, a village in northeastern France
 Damas-et-Bettegney, a village in northeastern France
 Damas, Egypt, a city in Dakahlia Governorate, Egypt
 Damas River (Chile), a river in southern Chile
 Damas River (Eritrea), a seasonal river of Eritrea
 Pichi Damas River, a river of Chile
 Isla Damas, an island of Costa Rica
 Damascus, the capital city of Syria

Surname
 Arturo Rivera y Damas (1923–1994), fifth Archbishop of San Salvador
 Claude Damas Ozimo (born 1939), Gabonese politician
 François-Étienne de Damas (1764–1828), French general
 Georges Aleka Damas (1902–1982), composer of "La Concorde", the national anthem of Gabon
 Germán Carrera Damas (born 1930), a Venezuelan historian
 Ivo Damas (born 1977), Portuguese football player
 Joseph-François-Louis-Charles de Damas (1758–1829), French general
 Juan Velasco Damas (born 1977), Spanish footballer
 Léon Damas (1912–1978), French poet and politician
 Miguel Gómez Damas (1785–1849), Spanish general during the First Carlist War
 Vítor Damas (1947–2003), Portuguese goalkeeper
 Carlos Damas (1973), Portuguese violinist

Family

 House of Damas, one of France's oldest noble families since the 9th century

Other
 Damas (skipper), a genus of skippers in the family Hesperiidae.
 Daewoo Damas, a small van made by Daewoo
 Draughts The board game draughts

See also
 Damas de Blanco ("Ladies in White"), a Cuban human rights organization
 Damas y Caballeros!, a live album by Los Straitjackets
 Damas Towers, former name of the Angsana Hotel & Suites complex